The 2008 Nürburgring Superbike World Championship round was the seventh round of the 2008 Superbike World Championship season. It took place on the weekend of June 13–15, 2008, at the Nürburgring.

Superbike race 1 classification

Superbike race 2 classification

Supersport race classification

Notes
The Superbike Race 2 was stopped after 14 laps for rain. However, full points were given.
The Supersport race was stopped after one lap for a crash at the first corner. The race was restarted for its full length but three riders (Hill, de Gea and Veneman) were injured and did not take part.

Nurburgring Round
Nurburgring Superbike
Sport in Rhineland-Palatinate